"Marge Be Not Proud" is the eleventh episode of the seventh season of the American animated television series The Simpsons. It originally aired on the Fox network in the United States on December 17, 1995. In the episode, Marge refuses to buy Bart the new video game Bonestorm, so he steals it from a local discount store. Bart is estranged from his mother after he gets caught, so he works to regain her love and trust.

The episode was written by Mike Scully and directed by Steven Dean Moore. Scully got the inspiration for it from an experience in his childhood when he shoplifted. Lawrence Tierney guest-starred in the episode as Don Brodka.

Since airing, the episode has received mostly positive reviews from television critics. It acquired a Nielsen rating of 9.5, and was the fourth highest-rated show on Fox the week it aired.

Plot
Bart wants the new video game Bonestorm, but Marge refuses to buy it because it is too violent, expensive, and distracts children from their school work. Unable to rent it or play Milhouse's copy, Bart visits the local Try-N-Save discount store, where Jimbo Jones and Nelson Muntz convince him to steal a copy. Bart is caught by security guard Detective Don Brodka, who calls Homer and Marge, but leaves a message because they are not home. Detective Brodka orders him to leave the store and never come back. He threatens Bart by telling him he will face criminal charges and spend the holidays in juvenile hall if he returns to his store again. Bart rushes home and successfully intercepts the message by switching out the answering machine tape with Allan Sherman's "Hello Muddah, Hello Faddah."

Unaware of Bart's crime, Marge takes the family to the same store to get their annual Christmas picture taken. Bart is spotted by Detective Brodka, who shows a disbelieving Marge and Homer the security footage of their son shoplifting. Bart tries to apologize to Marge, but she rebuffs him and sends him to bed. Concerned she may be mothering Bart too much, Marge decides he is old enough to make his own decisions and bans Bart from family activities as punishment for his misdemeanor, such as making snow statues and decorating the Christmas tree. Worried he has lost Marge's love, Bart convinces Milhouse's mother, Luann, to spend time with him.

To regain his mother's love, Bart shops at Try-N-Save and returns home with a bulge in his coat. Thinking he has shoplifted again, Marge confronts Bart, who reveals he bought a Christmas present for her: a photo of himself smiling. Overjoyed at getting this early Christmas gift, Marge gives Bart his present: the golf simulator video game Lee Carvallo's Putting Challenge. Though underwhelmed, Bart thanks her and they reconcile.

Production

Mike Scully, the writer of the episode, based it on an experience in his childhood. Scully was twelve years old when he paid a visit to the Bradlees discount department store in West Springfield, Massachusetts. A "bunch of guys" were shoplifting at the store, and they "pressured" Scully into shoplifting as well. He ended up getting caught outside, and "had one of the most traumatic moments" of his life. "To this day it still terrifies me", Scully said. He jokingly told Variety, "It's great to be paid for reliving the horrors of your life".

The episode was directed by Steven Dean Moore. The show runner of The Simpsons at the time, Bill Oakley, thinks this is one of the most "beautifully" directed episodes of the show. He called the "hand-colouring" very "vivid" and "bright". The episode is the first Christmas episode the producers had done since the first episode of the series, "Simpsons Roasting on an Open Fire". Oakley said that nobody in the writing staff wanted to "try on Christmas" because it was "so famous" as being the first episode.

Lawrence Tierney guest-starred in the episode as Don Brodka. Another former show runner, Josh Weinstein, called Tierney's appearance "the craziest guest star experience we ever had". In addition to yelling at and intimidating employees of the show, Tierney made requests they considered unreasonable, such as abandoning his distinctive voice to do the part in a southern accent and refusing to perform lines if he did not "get the jokes". Despite this, Oakley and Weinstein thought Tierney did a good job. Weinstein said, "He certainly delivered and he's one of my favorite characters we have had [on the show]".

"Marge Be Not Proud" originally aired on the Fox network in the United States on December 17, 1995. The episode was selected for release in a 1999 video collection of selected episodes, titled: Bart Wars. Other episodes included in the collection set were "Mayored to the Mob", "Dog of Death", and "The Secret War of Lisa Simpson". The episode was again included in the 2005 DVD release of the Bart Wars set. The episode was included in The Simpsons season seven DVD set, which was released on December 13, 2005. Oakley, Weinstein, Scully, Moore, and Silverman participated in the DVD's audio commentary.

Reception
In its original broadcast, "Marge Be Not Proud" finished 47th in the ratings for the week of December 11 to 17, 1995, with a Nielsen rating of 9.5. The episode was the fourth highest-rated show on the Fox network that week, following a boxing match, Fox NFL Sunday, and The X-Files.

Since airing, the episode has received mostly positive reviews from television critics. The authors of the book I Can't Believe It's a Bigger and Better Updated Unofficial Simpsons Guide, Warren Martyn and Adrian Wood, wrote: "A Christmas special in all but name, and a touching look at the relationship between Marge and her growing Bart." Dave Foster of DVD Times said that "thanks to the keen eye of the writers and the rarely shown good side of Bart, this episode works very well as both an amusing insight to the way a child’s mind works and as a strong relationship building episode between Bart and Marge."

DVD Movie Guide's Colin Jacobson said that despite being one of the "sappier" episodes at times, it "still packs some terrific laughs". Jacobson commented that he "absolutely lost it when Homer’s drawing of a robot grilling a hot dog was seen – it’s funnier if you see it – and Lawrence Tierney’s guest turn as the store detective adds hilarious grit to the show." He added that the episode does not "fall into the classic" category, "but it offers more than enough entertainment to satisfy". Jennifer Malkowski of DVD Verdict considered the best part of the episode to be when a depressed Bart makes a snowman from the dirty, leftover snow under the car. She called the scene "amazingly pathetic". Malkowski concluded her review by giving the episode a grade of B.

In 2011, Richard Lawson of The Atlantic Wire cited it as the best Christmas episode of The Simpsons, noting that "it's very sweet and there are some funny videogame jokes". He added that the episode "features a terrific guest starring voice performance from the late Lawrence Tierney". Raphael Bob-Waksberg, commenting on the influence The Simpsons was on BoJack Horseman, cited the episode as a favorite: "My favorite episode is ‘Marge Be Not Proud,’ where Bart steals a video game [creating a rift with his mother]. It’s an insanely well-crafted joke episode but it’s also incredibly sincere and beautiful and heartbreaking."

Legacy
A playable, fan-made version of Lee Carvallo's Putting Challenge was released on June 15, 2020.

References

External links

A playable "recreation" of Lee Carvallo's Putting Challenge on itch.io

American Christmas television episodes
The Simpsons (season 7) episodes
1995 American television episodes
Television episodes about video games